Johann Sebastian Bach composed the church cantata  (An open mind) (literally: An undyed mind), 24 in Leipzig for the fourth Sunday after Trinity and first performed it on 20 June 1723. It is the third new cantata of his first cantata cycle in Leipzig. The title has been translated more freely, for example as "An unstained mind", "An unblemished conscience", "An undisguised intention", and "An unsophisticated mind".

History and words 
Bach had begun to compose one cantata for almost every Sunday and holiday of the liturgical year, a project described by Christoph Wolff as "an artistic undertaking on the largest scale".

The prescribed readings for the Sunday were from the Epistle to the Romans, "For the earnest expectation of the creature waiteth for the manifestation of the sons of God", and from the Sermon on the Mount in the Gospel of Luke: the admonition to "be merciful" and "judge not". It seems likely that Bach had not found yet a poet in Leipzig. He used a cantata text by Erdmann Neumeister, published already in 1714 in the collection  (Spiritual poetry with inserted biblical quotations and chorales). In a composition of symmetry, Neumeister placed in the centre a quotation from the Sermon on the Mount in the Gospel of Matthew, "Therefore all things whatsoever ye would that men should do to you, do ye even so to them: for this is the law and the prophets.". He framed it by two recitatives, and those by two arias. The topic of the first recitative is "" (Sincerity is one of God's gifts). In opposition, the topic of the second is "" (Hypocrisy is a beast coughed up by Belial). The poetry on "" (The Christians' deeds and behaviour), stressing "" (truth and goodness), has been criticised as "too didactic". Gillies Whittaker described it as "dry, didactic statements and crude denunciations of the failings of mankind". The cantata is closed by the first stanza of Johann Heermann's hymn "O Gott, du frommer Gott" (1630).

It seems likely that Bach performed in the same service also the earlier cantata , composed for the same occasion in Weimar in 1715. He had presented cantatas in two parts on the preceding three Sundays, the new works , and Die Himmel erzählen die Ehre Gottes, BWV 76, and the earlier . On the fourth Sunday he likely performed one cantata before and the other after the sermon. According to Christoph Wolff, he probably performed the new work first.

Scoring and structure 
The cantata in six movements is scored for three vocal soloists (alto, tenor and bass), a four-part choir, clarino, two oboes, two oboes d'amore, two violins, viola and basso continuo.

Music 
In his composition, Bach stresses the weight of the central biblical quotation by giving it to the choir, and by scoring the framing recitatives and arias with reduced accompaniment. The obbligato part in the first aria is played by the violins and viola in unison and resembles the vocal part. According to John Eliot Gardiner, Bach thus evokes an "unstained mind". Julian Mincham notes the "sombre and shaded tone quality" of the unison strings. The following recitative, termed an "exemplary mini-sermon in its own right", is secco and ends in an arioso. Here as in the first work for the same occasion, BWV 185, Bach shows the mirror effect of the words, "" (Make yourself into such an image, as you would have your neighbour be!) by imitation of voice and continuo. This phrase is rendered three times.

The central choral movement, "a powerful chorus which forms the core of the cantata", is in two sections: the complete text is once rendered in a free form, then again as a fugue, comparable to the concept prelude and fugue. Two oboes double the strings, a clarino plays an independent part. The prelude is in three symmetric sections. The fugue, a double fugue marked "vivace allegro", begins with the first vocal entrance only accompanied by the continuo, the first vocal entries are sung by the concertisten, the choir joins later. The music reaches a climax when the clarino plays the theme as a fifth part to the four vocal parts. The movement ends in free sequences. Mincham describes the "ceaseless activity through constant musical movement" of the music, the "fragmented rhythm" of the countersubject and the "breathless urgency" of the coda.

The following recitative is similar to the first in structure, but accompanied by the strings adding emphasis, mostly on strong beats. The final arioso, without the strings, stresses the prayer "" (May dear God spare me from it!). The last aria is accompanied by two oboi d'amore; they play a long "doleful" introduction that is repeated as a postlude. The voice picks up their beginning motif. The tenor voice sings an unusual coloratura line when the text ends on "" (makes us like God and the angels), possibly representing the multitude of the Heavenly host.

The eight lines of the closing chorale in homophonic four-part vocal setting are richly framed by orchestral interludes and accompanied by the instruments. Bach found the style of chorale treatment in works by his predecessor in Leipzig, Johann Kuhnau. The last prayer asks for "" (an unsullied soul) "" (and a clear conscience).

Recordings 
The listing is taken from the selection on the Bach Cantatas Website.

 Bach Made in Germany Vol. 1 – Cantatas VI, Günther Ramin, Thomanerchor, Gewandhausorchester, Eva Fleischer, Gert Lutze, Hans Hauptmann, Leipzig Classics 1952
 J. S. Bach: Das Kantatenwerk – Sacred Cantatas Vol. 2, Nikolaus Harnoncourt, Wiener Sängerknaben & Chorus Viennensis, Concentus Musicus Wien, Paul Esswood, Kurt Equiluz, Max van Egmond, Teldec 1973
 Bach Cantatas Vol. 3 – Ascension Day, Whitsun, Trinity, Karl Richter, Münchener Bach-Chor, Münchener Bach-Orchester, Anna Reynolds, Peter Schreier, Dietrich Fischer-Dieskau, Archiv Produktion 1975
 Die Bach Kantate Vol. 41, Helmuth Rilling, Gächinger Kantorei, Bach-Collegium Stuttgart, Arleen Augér, Helen Watts, Adalbert Kraus, Wolfgang Schöne, Hänssler 1978
 J. S. Bach: Complete Cantatas Vol. 7, Ton Koopman, Amsterdam Baroque Orchestra & Choir, Bogna Bartosz, Gerd Türk, Klaus Mertens, Antoine Marchand 1997
 J. S. Bach: Cantatas Vol. 9 – Leipzig Cantatas, Masaaki Suzuki, Bach Collegium Japan, Robin Blaze, Gerd Türk, Chiyuki Urano, BIS 1998
 Bach Cantatas Vol. 3: Tewkesbury/Mühlhausen, John Eliot Gardiner, Monteverdi Choir, English Baroque Soloists, Nathalie Stutzmann, Paul Agnew, Nicolas Testé, Soli Deo Gloria 2000
 Bach Edition Vol. 21 – Cantatas Vol. 12, Pieter Jan Leusink, Holland Boys Choir, Netherlands Bach Collegium, Sytse Buwalda, Marcel Beekman, Bas Ramselaar, Brilliant Classics 2000

References

External links 
 
 Ein ungefärbt Gemüte BWV 24; BC A 102 / Sacred cantata (4th Sunday after Trinity), Bach Digital
 Luke Dahn: BWV 24.6 bach-chorales.com

Church cantatas by Johann Sebastian Bach
1723 compositions